Nette is a river in Lower Saxony, Germany, a left tributary of the Innerste.

The Nette rises in the Harz, in the municipality of Seesen. The Nette flows through Bockenem before reaching the Innerste in Holle, between Hildesheim and Salzgitter.

See also
List of rivers of Lower Saxony

References

Rivers of Lower Saxony
Rivers of Germany